, short for , is an anime television series produced by AIC Build based on the light novel series by Yomi Hirasaka. It follows a group of misfits who have trouble making friends and form the Neighbors Club with the goal of making friends. There are a total of 26 anime episodes, 24 being televised, and 1 OVA preceding each season.

An OVA episode was bundled with the seventh light novel volume on September 22, 2011. The anime television series aired on TBS and MBS between October 7 and December 23, 2011, and was also simulcast on Niconico. Another OVA episode was released on September 26, 2012. Funimation Entertainment has licensed the series in North America.

A second season, Haganai NEXT, aired between January 11 and March 29, 2013.

Episode list

Haganai (2011) 

The broadcast for the TV series was aired after midnight, so October 6, 2011 premiere on 25:50 on TBS actually occurred on October 7, 2011 at 01:50. The English titles listed for the TV series parts are from the Funimation and Hulu listings.

Haganai NEXT (2013) 
The episodes are named after various light novel series.
The broadcast for the TV series on TBS Japan was aired after midnight, so the January 10, 2013 premiere occurred on January 11, 2013. The English titles listed are from the Funimation and Hulu listings.

Notes 
The episode titles of Haganai NEXT are references to these light novel series:
A. My Teen Romantic Comedy SNAFU
B. Ranobe-bu
C. Oreimo
D. Nakaimo - My Sister Is Among Them!
E. Sonna Asobi wa Ikemasen!
F. Unbreakable Machine-Doll
G. OniAi
H. Oreshura
I. Mayoi Neko Overrun!
J. The "Hentai" Prince and the Stony Cat.
K. Mayo Chiki!

Footnotes

References

Haganai